Hilarius is the given name of:

 Hilarius of Aquileia (died c. 284), saint, bishop of Aquileia, Italy
 Hilarius or Hilary of Poitiers (c. 310 – c. 367), Bishop of Poitiers and Doctor of the Church
 Hilary the Deacon (Latin: Hilarius Diaconus), Sardinian deacon of the Roman church
 Hilarius, Archbishop of Tarragona (Spain) c. 402
 Hilarius or Hilary of Arles (c. 403–449), Bishop of Arles and saint
 Hilarius (praefectus urbi), praefectus urbi (prefect of Rome) in 408
 Pope Hilarius or Hilary (died 468), Catholic pope and saint
 Hilarius (poet)
 Hilarius Breitinger (1907–1994), German Franciscan prelate
 Hilarius Gilges (1909–1933), Afro-German actor and communist
 Hilarius Moa Nurak (1943–2016), Roman Catholic bishop
 Hilarius of Sexten (secular name Christian Gatterer) (1839–1900), Austrian Capuchin theologian

See also
 Hilary (name)

Latin masculine given names